Ryszard Wasik (2 May 1931 – 22 March 2021) was a Polish politician and shipping captain.

Biography
At the age of 14, Wasik ran away from his home in Dąbrowa Górnicza and settled in Gdynia, where he joined the crew of a fishing boat. In 1949, he was admitted to the Maritime University of Szczecin. He then worked for Polish Ocean Lines as an officer. In 1972, he was elected to the Sejm in the Szczecin district as a member of the Polish United Workers' Party, where he was a member of the Maritime Economy and Shipping Committee and the Foreign Trade Committee. He then worked at the Polish consul of maritime affairs in New York City. Upon his return to Poland, he continued to sail until his retirement in 1991.

Ryszard Wasik died in Szczecin on 22 March 2021 at the age of 89. He was buried in the Central Cemetery, Szczecin on 31 March.

References

1931 births
2021 deaths
Members of the Polish Sejm 1972–1976
Polish United Workers' Party members
People from Sosnowiec